B2MML, or Business To Manufacturing Markup Language, is an XML implementation of the ANSI/ISA-95 family of standards (ISA-95), known internationally as IEC/ISO 62264. B2MML consists of a set of XML schemas written using the World Wide Web Consortium's XML Schema language (XSD) that implement the data models in the ISA-95 standard.

B2MML is meant to be a common data definition to link ERP and supply chain management systems with manufacturing systems such as Industrial Control Systems and Manufacturing Execution Systems.

B2MML is published by the Manufacturing Enterprise Solutions Association (MESA).

External links 
 The Forum for Automation and Manufacturing Professionals
 WBF has merged with MESA. Information found on MESA.org
 B2MML information on MESA.org

Production and manufacturing software
American National Standards Institute standards
ERP software